These are the official results of the Men's 400 metres event at the 1993 IAAF World Championships in Stuttgart, Germany. There were a total number of 43 participating athletes, with six qualifying heats and the final held on Tuesday 1993-08-17.

Final

Semifinals
Held on Monday 1993-08-16

Quarterfinals
Held on Sunday 1993-08-15

Qualifying heats
Held on Saturday 1993-08-14

See also
 1990 Men's European Championships 400 metres (Split)
 1991 Men's World Championships 400 metres (Tokyo)
 1992 Men's Olympic Games 400 metres (Barcelona)
 1994 Men's European Championships 400 metres (Helsinki)
 1995 Men's World Championships 400 metres (Gothenburg)
 1996 Men's Olympic Games 400 metres (Atlanta)

References
 Results

 
400 metres at the World Athletics Championships